James Edwards (11 December 1905 – April 1982) was an English footballer who played as a left half or inside left.

Career
Edwards was born in Tipton, Staffordshire. He joined West Bromwich Albion for a £350 fee in May 1926 and made his league debut for the club in March 1928 against Hull City. He was a member of the team that won the FA Cup in 1931 and promotion to the Football League First Division in the same year.

In May 1937 he moved to Norwich City for £750. He died in a West Bromwich hospital in April 1982 after becoming ill at his house in Birmingham New Road, Dudley.

References
 

1905 births
1982 deaths
English footballers
Association football wing halves
Association football inside forwards
West Bromwich Albion F.C. players
Norwich City F.C. players
Sportspeople from Tipton
English Football League players
English Football League representative players
FA Cup Final players